Dissection is the dismembering of the body of a deceased animal or plant to study its anatomical structure.

Dissection may also refer to:

The dissection problem in geometry
Dissection (medical),  a tear in a blood vessel
Dissection (band), a Swedish extreme metal band 
Dissection (album), a 1997 Crimson Thorn album
Dissected plateau, a plateau area